ResMed Inc. is a San Diego, California-based medical equipment company. It primarily provides cloud-connectable medical devices for the treatment of sleep apnea (such as CPAP devices and masks), chronic obstructive pulmonary disease (COPD), and other respiratory conditions. ResMed produced hundreds of thousands of ventilators and bilevel devices to help treat the respiratory symptoms of patients with COVID-19. ResMed also provides software to out-of-hospital care agencies to streamline transitions of care into and between these care settings for seniors and their care providers (i.e. home health, hospice, skilled nursing facilities, life plan communities, senior living centers, and private duty).

ResMed employs more than 8,000 employees worldwide as of June 2022. The company operates in more than 140 countries worldwide, and has manufacturing facilities in Australia, Singapore, France, and the United States. Revenue was US$3.6 billion in fiscal year 2022.

History
ResMed was established in 1989 by Peter Farrell in Australia. It relocated to San Diego in 1990. On March 1, 2013, Peter's son Mick Farrell became the company's new CEO. Peter transitioned to a non-executive role at the end of the year.

False claims settlement 
In January 2020, ResMed Inc. agreed to pay more than $37.5 million to resolve alleged kickbacks paid to DME suppliers, sleep labs, and other healthcare providers in violation of the Anti-Kickback Statute.

References

External links

Companies based in San Diego
Companies established in 1989
Companies listed on the New York Stock Exchange
Companies listed on the Australian Securities Exchange